Zamir Tagirovich Yushaev (Russian: Зами́р Таги́рович Юша́ев, born 22 April 1965, Khasavyurt, Dagestan ASSR, RSFSR, USSR) is a Chechen artist, now living in Leipzig, Germany. He is a member of the Union of Artists of Germany.

Biography 
Yushaev was born on 22 April 1965, into a large family in Khasavyurt, with a father who was a watchmaker and amateur artist. In 1984, he graduated from an art school in Makhachkala, and then served in the Soviet Army for the next two years. From 1987 to 1992, along with his older brother, Sultan,  he studied at the Imperial Academy of Arts in St. Petersburg. In 1997, he graduated from the Institute of Arts at the Leipzig University.

Since 1999, he has lived in Germany and works in his studio-gallery in Leipzig. He became a member of the Union of Artists of Germany.

Style and works 
Yushaev works in the genre of surrealism, and most recently, performance art. Some of his paintings are held in private and state collections in countries such as Austria, Brazil, Germany, Denmark, France, Japan, Norway, Spain, Sweden, Turkey, Czech Republic, the United States, and many others. He also draws caricatures upon request.

His work is very successful. Among his customers are Angelina Jolie, the late Montserrat Caballé and Russian politicians and businessmen. He positions himself as a representative of the Chechen people and their creativity; this is shown by the fact that he always wears Circassian clothes and that most of his work contains Chechen symbols.

He is fond of martial arts, having won many awards such as a black belt in karate.

References

Literature

External links 
 Official site

1965 births
Living people
Imperial Academy of Arts alumni
Leipzig University alumni
People from Khasavyurt
Russian painters